Nicolò Parisini (born 25 April 2000) is an Italian racing cyclist, who currently rides for UCI ProTeam .

Major results

2018
 1st  Overall Tre Giorni Ciclista Bresciana
1st Stages 1 & 3
 2nd Road race, National Junior Road Championships
 4th Overall Aubel–Thimister–Stavelot
 6th Trofeo Comune di Vertova
 7th Gran Premio dell'Arno
2021
 7th Giro del Medio Brenta
2022
 6th Road race, UEC European Under-23 Road Championships

References

External links

2000 births
Living people
Italian male cyclists
People from Voghera